The spot-winged pigeon (Patagioenas maculosa) is a species of bird in the family Columbidae. It is found in Argentina, Bolivia, Brazil, Chile, Paraguay, Peru, and Uruguay.

Taxonomy and systematics

At least one author has asserted, based on plumage similarities, that the spot-winged pigeon, picazuro pigeon (P. picazuro), bare-eyed pigeon (P. corensis), and scaled pigeon (P. speciosa) form a monophyletic group. Others argue that significant vocal differences belie that.

According to the International Ornithological Committee (IOC), the Clements taxonomy, and the South American Classification Committee of the American Ornithological Society, the spot-winged pigeon has two subspecies, the nominate P. m. maculosa and P. m. albipennis, . The Handbook of the Birds of the World treats the latter as a separate species, white-winged pigeon.

Description

The two subspecies of spot-winged pigeon differ significantly in their plumage. The adult male's forehead, crown, nape, hindneck, and breast are mostly dull purplish pink and the rest of the head and underparts are gray. The upper back and wing coverts are dark brown and show creamy white spots. The wings are mostly black above and pale gray below. The lower back and rump are bluish gray and the tail dark gray. The adult female is similar but the head and neck are generally duller. The juvenile is also similar, but duller all over with drab gray head and breast.

The adults' head, neck, rump, and the whole of the underparts are blue-gray with a purplish wash that is especially pronounced in the male. The upper back and wing coverts are gray-brown. The folded wing shows a conspicuous white band that contrasts with the otherwise dark wing. As in the nominate subspecies, the juvenile is a duller version of the adult.

Distribution and habitat

P. m. maculosa is found in southeastern Bolivia south and east through Paraguay, southern Brazil, and Uruguay to south-central Argentina. It shuns towns. P. m. albipennis is found from central Peru south to western and central Bolivia, extreme northwestern Argentina, and far northern Chile. It is locally common in towns.

Behavior

Feeding

Both subspecies of spot-winged pigeon typically feed in flocks on the ground. P. m. maculosas diet is mostly seeds, including rice and sunflower, but it has been observed eating fruit and leaves. P. m. albipenniss diet has not been studied.

Breeding

P. m. maculosa breeds year round in Argentina and probably does so in Brazil. It builds a fragile nest in trees and lays one or two eggs. P. m. albipenniss breeding phenology has not been studied, but "frequency of calling apparently increases in Oct, suggesting that this might indicate the onset of the breeding season."

Vocalization

P. m. maculosas song is "a rhythmic series of very hoarse-sounding coos...'cuuuuu uh-cuh-cuuuh...' repeated two or three times. Its call is "a repeated growling 'grwhoh'". P. m. albipenniss song is "a gruff 'rrrrrow grr-g’RRRR grr-g’RRRR grr-g’RRRR'" and its call a "short 'corw'".

Status

The IUCN treats P. m. maculosa and P. m. albipennis as separate species, and has assessed both at being of Least Concern. P. m. maculosa is common and widespread in the southern part of its range, and its population might be increasing. P. m. albipennis is distributed more locally, but its population might also be growing.

References

spot-winged pigeon
Birds of Brazil
Birds of Argentina
Birds of Paraguay
Birds of Uruguay
spot-winged pigeon
Taxonomy articles created by Polbot
Birds of South America